The Shenzhen anti-police riot began in Shenzhen, People's Republic of China November 7, 2008 when a policeman threw a walkie talkie at a speeding motorcyclist causing the driver to lose control of his bike.  The driver then crashed into a lamp post and died a few hours later.  The biker's relatives began gathering people starting a riot against the local police station that grew to involve hundreds of people and thousands of bystanders.

See also
2008 Guizhou riot
Shishou incident

References

Further reading

Shenzhen
Riots and civil disorder in China
Shenzhen
Shenzhen